Traeng is a commune (khum) in Rotanak Mondol District, Battambang Province in north-western Cambodia.

Villages

 Kilou
 Phcheav
 Chea Montrei
 Chi Sang
 Kilou Samprambei
 Svay Sa
 Ta Krok

References

Communes of Battambang province
Rotanak Mondol District